Tupiocoris is a genus of plant bugs in the family Miridae. There are about 9 described species in Tupiocoris.

Species
 Tupiocoris agilis (Uhler, 1877)
 Tupiocoris californicus (Stal, 1859)
 Tupiocoris killamae Schwartz and Scudder, 2003
 Tupiocoris notatus (Distant, 1893) (suckfly)
 Tupiocoris rhododendri (Dolling, 1972)
 Tupiocoris rubi (Knight, 1968)
 Tupiocoris rufescens 
 Tupiocoris similis (Kelton, 1980)
 Tupiocoris tinctus (Knight, 1943)

References

Further reading

 
 

Miridae genera
Dicyphini